Wolfisberg is a former municipality in the Oberaargau administrative district in the canton of Bern in Switzerland. On 1 January 2020 the former municipality of Wolfisberg merged into Niederbipp.

Geography
Of this area, 45.7% is used for agricultural purposes, while 49.8% is forested. The rest of the land, (4.5%) is settled.

Demographics
, 2.7% of the population was made up of foreign nationals. Over the last 10 years the population has decreased at a rate of -1.6%. Most of the population speaks German (96.6%), with Albanian being second most common ( 1.7%) and French being third ( 1.1%).

In the 2007 election the most popular party was the SVP which received 45.1% of the vote. The next three most popular parties were the SPS (19.8%), the Green Party (16%) and the FDP (8.3%).

The age distribution of the population is children and teenagers (0–19 years old) make up 24.7% of the population, while adults (20–64 years old) make up 59.8% and seniors (over 64 years old) make up 15.5%. In Wolfisberg about 81.2% of the population (between age 25-64) have completed either non-mandatory upper secondary education or additional higher education (either university or a Fachhochschule).

Wolfisberg has an unemployment rate of 0%. , there were 9 people employed in the primary economic sector and about 4 businesses involved in this sector. 1 person is employed in the secondary sector and there is 1 business in this sector. 5 people are employed in the tertiary sector, with 2 businesses in this sector.

References

Former municipalities of the canton of Bern